Cucujus is a genus of beetles in the family Cucujidae, the flat bark beetles. It contains 19 currently recognized species and subspecies.

Description
Species of Cucujus are of moderate size (6-25mm), greatly dorso-ventrally compressed, and brightly colored, often red or red and black. Additionally, they can distinguished from other members of the family by the head being generally wider than the pronotum with prominent temples, and the elongate, inverted male genitalia with a flagellum. The genus occurs throughout the Holarctic region, with indigenous species in North America, Europe, and Asia. It is most diverse in Asia.

Ecology
The biology of most species in the genus is poorly known. All life stages live under dead bark, where they apparently are predacious. Larvae also are dorso-ventrally compressed. Cucujus clavipes puniceus, which occurs in western North America, has been the subject of considerable research interest due to its ability to produce natural antifreeze compounds.

Species
 Cucujus bicolor Smith, 1851
 Cucujus chinensis Lee & Sâto, 2007
 Cucujus cinnaberinus Scopoli, 1763
 Cucujus clavipes Fabricius
 Cucujus clavipes clavipes Fabricius, 1781
 Cucujus clavipes puniceus Mannerheim, 1843
 Cucujus coccinatus Lewis, 1881
 Cucujus coloniarius (Olliff, 1885) (syn. of  C. bicolor?)
 Cucujus costatus Zhao & Zhang, 2019
 Cucujus elongatus Lee & Pütz, 2008
 Cucujus grouvellei Reitter, 1877
Cucujus haematodes Erichson
 Cucujus haematodes haematodes Erichson, 1845
 Cucujus haematodes caucasicus Motschulsky, 1845
 Cucujus haematodes opacus Lewis, 1888
 Cucujus janatai Háva, Zahradník & Růžička, 2019
 Cucujus kempi Grouvelle, 1913
 Cucujus mniszechi Grouvelle, 1874
 Cucujus muelleri Bussler, 2017
 Cucujus nigripennis Lee & Sâto, 2007
 Cucujus tulliae Bonacci, Mazzei, Horák, & Brandmayr, 2012

References

Cucujidae
Cucujoidea genera
Beetles of Asia
Beetles of Europe
Beetles of North America
Taxa named by Johan Christian Fabricius
Taxonomy articles created by Polbot